Emma Darcy is the pseudonym used by the Australian husband–wife writing team of Wendy Brennan (28 November 1940 – 12 December 2020) and Frank Brennan (1936 – 1995), they wrote in collaboration over 45 romance novels. In 1993, for the Emma Darcy pseudonym's 10th anniversary, they created the "Emma Darcy Award Contest" to encourage authors to finish their manuscripts. After the death of Frank Brennan in 1995, Wendy wrote on her own. She lived in New South Wales, Australia.

Darcy sold 60 million books from 1983 to 2001, and averaged six new books per year.

In 2002, Darcy's first crime novel Who Killed Angelique? won the Ned Kelly Award for Best First Novel.  In 2003, the next novel, Who Killed Bianca, was a finalist for the Ned Kelly Award for Best Novel.

Personal life

Wendy Brennan
Wendy was born 28 November 1940 in Australia, she had an Honours degree in Latin and worked as a high school English teacher. She was reputedly the first woman computer programmer in the southern hemisphere. She died on 12 December 2020.

Frank Brennan
Frank Brennan was a businessman. He died in 1995.

The marriage
Frank Brennan and Wendy married, and she left her job. The marriage had three sons. They were voracious readers, and they decided to write their own novels under the pseudonym Emma Darcy.

Wendy died at Forresters Beach, New South Wales, Australia on 12 December 2020. She was survived by her 5 grandchildren and 3 adult sons.

Writing career
As Emma Darcy, they sold her first novels in 1983. Darcy sold 60 million books from 1983 to 2001, and averaged six new books per year.

In 2002, Darcy's first crime novel Who Killed Angelique? won the Ned Kelly Award for Best First Novel.  In 2003, the next novel, Who Killed Bianca, was a finalist for the Ned Kelly Award for Best Novel.

Emma Darcy Award Contest
In 1993 Frank and Wendy Brennan created the "Emma Darcy Award Contest" to encourage authors to finish their manuscripts.  It had a prize of $2,000 and a guarantee that the manuscript would be seen by an acquiring editor.

Winners:
1994 – Tracey Cooper-Posey
1995 – Ginny Gibbs for The Last Resort
1996 – Bronwyn Jamesonfor For Love or Money
1997 – Fiona Brand for Cullen's Bride
1998 – Jill Watkinson for Black Pearl
1999 – Yvonne Lindsay for The Father Deal
2000 – Lucy Forster & Danielle Ellis
2001 – Laura Ruch for Full Circle (retitled The Tie that Binds)

Sister of Wendy Brennan 
Miranda Lee was a romance writer and the sister of Wendy Brennan.

Bibliography as Emma Darcy

Single Novels
Tangle of Torment (1983)
Twisting Shadows (1983)
A World Apart (1984)
Fantasy (1985)
Don't Play Games (1985)
Song of a Wren (1985)
Point of Impact (1985)
The Impossible Woman (1985)
Man in the Park (1986)
Woman of Honour (1986)
Blind Date (1986)
Don't Ask Me Now (1986)
The Wrong Mirror (1986)
The Unpredictable Man (1986)
One That Got Away (1987)
Strike at the Heart (1987)
Positive Approach (1987)
Mistress of Pillatoro (1987)
Whirlpool of Passion (1987)
Always Love (1988)
The Falcon's Mistress (1988)
A Priceless Love (1988)
Aloha Bride (1988)
The Ultimate Choice (1989)
The Power and the Passion (1989)
Pattern of Deceit (1989)
The Colour of Desire (1990)
Too Strong to Deny (1990)
One-woman Crusade (1990)
Bride of Diamonds (1990)
To Tame a Wild Heart (1992)
Breaking Point (1992)
High Risk (1992)
The Wedding (1992)
The Seduction of Keira (1992)
The Velvet Tiger (1992)
An Impossible Dream (1993)
The Upstairs Lover (1993)
A Very Stylish Affair (1993)
The Last Grand Passion (1993)
The Sheikh's Revenge (1993)
A Wedding to Remember (1994)
In Need of a Wife (1994)
Burning with Passion (1995)
The Fatherhood Affair (1995)
The Father of Her Child (1996)
Jack's Baby (1996)
Last Stop Marriage (1996)
Craving Jamie (1997)
The Secrets Within (1997)
Marriage Meltdown (1997)
Merry Christmas (1997)
The Sheikh's Seduction (1998)
The Marriage Decider (1999)
A Marriage Betrayed (1999)
Bride of His Choice (1999)
Mistress to a Tycoon (2001)
The Sweetest Revenge (2001)
The Hot-blooded Groom (2001)
Claiming His Mistress (2001)
A Spanish Marriage (2004)
His Bought Mistress (2004)
The Billionaire's Scandalous Marriage (2007)
Filling All the Holes (2007)
Three's Never a Crowd (2008)
The Master Player (2009)
The Billionaire's Housekeeper Mistress (2010)
Hidden Mistress, Public Wife (2011)
The Costarella Conquest (2011)
An Offer She Can't Refuse (2012)
The Incorrigible Playboy (2012)
His Most Exquisite Conquest (2013)

James Family Series
Ride the Storm (1991)
Dark Heritage (1992)
The Shining of Love (1994)
The Bedroom Surrender (2003)

Kings of the Outback Series
The Cattle King's Mistress (2000)
The Playboy King's Wife (2000)
The Pleasure King's Bride (2000)
Kings of the Outback (omnibus) (2004)

Who Killed...? Series
Who Killed Angelique? (2001)
Who Killed Bianca? (2002)
Who Killed Camilla? (2003)

Kings of Australia Series
The Arranged Marriage (2002)
The Bridal Bargain (2002)
The Honeymoon Contract (2002)
Kings of Australia (omnibus) (2005)

The Outback Knights
The Outback Marriage Ransom (2004)
The Outback Wedding Takeover (2004)
The Outback Bridal Rescue (2004)

A Year Down Under Series Multi-Author
Heart of the Outback (1993)
No Risks, No Prizes (1993)

Pages & Privileges Series Multi-Author
Climax of Passion (1995)

From Here to Paternity Series Multi-Author
Mischief and Marriage (1996)

This Time, Forever Series Multi-Author
Their Wedding Day (1996)

Scandals! Series Multi-Author
Seducing the Enemy (1997)

Man Talk Series Multi-Author
Fatherhood Fever! (1998)

Nanny Wanted Series Multi-Author
Inherited, One Nanny (1998)

Australians Series Multi-Author
1. Outback Heat (1998)
13. The Marriage Risk (2000)
26. The Blind-Date Bride (2003)

Expecting! Series Multi-Author
Having Leo's Child (1999)

Passion Series Multi-Author
The Secret Mistress (1999)
The Billionaire Bridegroom (2003)

In Love With Her Boss Series Multi-Author
His Boardroom Mistress (2003)
The Playboy Boss's Chosen Bride (2006)

Mistress to a Millionaire Series Multi-Author
The Bedroom Surrender (2003)
His Bought Mistress (2004)

The Ramirez Bride Series Multi-Author
1. The Ramirez Bride (2005)

Italian Husbands Series Multi-Author
The Italian's Stolen Bride (2005)

Latin Lovers Series Multi-Author
The Secret Baby Revenge (2006)

Desert Brides Series Multi-Author
Traded to the Sheikh (2006)

Ruthless! Series Multi-Author
The Playboy Boss's Chosen Bride (2006)
The Billionaire's Captive Bride (2007)
The Billionaire's Scandalous Marriage (2007)
Bought For Revenge, Bedded For Pleasure (2008)
Ruthlessly Bedded By the Italian Billionaire (2008)
Ruthless Billionaire, Forbidden Baby (2009)

Collections
The Emma Darcy Duet (1993)
The Collection (Seasonal Products) (1998)
Conveniently Yours (1999)
Seduced (2002)
Red-hot Passion (2003)
The Bedroom Surrender / Mistress to a Millionaire (2003)
Man in the Park / Point of Impact (2004)
Power and the Passion / Burning with Passion (2004)
Mistress to a Tycoon / Jack's Baby (2005)
Jack's Baby / Craving Jamie (2005)
Hot-blooded affairs: containing The Marriage Risk and The Hot-Blooded Groom (2008)
Outback Grooms (2008)
Secret Mistress / Marriage Betrayed (2008)

Omnibus in collaboration
Sunsational (1991) (with Emma Goldrick, Penny Jordan and Carole Mortimer)
Father Knows Last: High Risk, Guilty Passion (1996) (with Jacqueline Baird)
Passion with a Vengeance (1998) (with Jacqueline Baird and Sara Craven)
The Man She Married (1999) (with Annette Broadrick and Ann Major)
Desert Heat (1999) (with Lynne Graham and Sandra Marton)
Mothers-to-be (1999) (with Lynne Graham and Leigh Michaels)
Father and Child (2000) (with Jacqueline Baird and Sandra Marton)
Desert Destinies (2001) (with Helen Brooks and Mary Lyons)
A Christmas Seduction (2001) (with Helen Brooks and Catherine Spencer)
Latin Liaisons (2002) (with Lynne Graham)
An Australian Christmas (2002) (with Lindsay Armstrong and Miranda Lee)
Boardroom Baby (2003) (with Sandra Field and Kim Lawrence)
The Pregnancy Surprise (2003) (with Caroline Anderson and Gayle Wilson)
Australian Tycoons (2004) (with Marion Lennox and Margaret Way)
Seduced by a Sultan (2004) (with Liz Fielding and Sandra Marton)
Pregnant Brides (2004) (with Sandra Field and Carol Marinelli)
Risque Business (2005) (with Liz Fielding and Sharon Kendrick)
Her Playboy Challenge / The Outback Bridal Rescue (2005) (with Barbara Hannay)
Outback Desire (2006) (with Carol Marinelli and Margaret Way)
Billionaire Grooms (2006) (with Leigh Michaels and Sara Wood)
More Than a Mistress (2006) (with Anne Mather and Catherine Spencer)
Sweet Revenge (2006) (with Sara Craven and Kim Lawrence)
More Than a Mistress (2006) (with Anne Mather and Catherine Spencer)
Blind-Date Grooms (2007) (with Sara Craven and Jessica Hart)
From Boardroom to Bedroom (2008) (with Kim Lawrence and Nicola Marsh)
The Italian's Love-Child (2009) (with Sara Craven and Diana Hamilton)
Ruthless (2009) (with Helen Bianchin and Miranda Lee)
Love-Slave to the Sheikh / Traded to the Sheikh / At the Sheikh's Command (2009) (with Miranda Lee and Kate Walker)
Hired: A Bride for the Boss (2009) (with Susan Meier and Leigh Michaels)
At the Billionaire's Bidding (2009) (with Sharon Kendrick and Melanie Milburne)
Purchased for Passion (2009) (with Julia James and Annie West)

Non fiction
The How to Be A Successful Romance Writer (1995)

Notes

External links 
 Bibliography and cover scans
 No More Virgins, interview

20th-century Australian novelists
Australian romantic fiction writers
Literary collaborations
Ned Kelly Award winners